Blue Ball is an unincorporated community in New Castle County, Delaware, United States. Blue Ball is located at the junction of U.S. Route 202, Delaware Route 141, and Delaware Route 261, north of Wilmington. It takes it name from eponymous tavern. The area was originally developed by the Weldin family.
Many of the structures in the area has since been demolished.

See also
Alapocas Run State Park
Blue Ball Barn

References

External links

Unincorporated communities in New Castle County, Delaware
Unincorporated communities in Delaware